Erminio Frasca (5 giugno 1983) è un tiratore a volo italiano finalista ai Giochi Olimpici estivi di Pechino 2008

References

External links
 
 Erminio Frasca at Fiamme Oro

1983 births
Living people
Italian male sport shooters
Trap and double trap shooters
Olympic shooters of Italy
Shooters at the 2008 Summer Olympics
Shooters of Fiamme Oro
Sportspeople from the Province of Latina
21st-century Italian people